Rebekah Ashley Stott (born 17 June 1993) is a New Zealand footballer who plays for Brighton & Hove Albion in the English FA Women's Super League. She is a defender for the New Zealand women's national football team. She previously played for Australian W-League teams Brisbane Roar, Melbourne Victory and Melbourne City as well as German Bundesliga team SC Sand, Sky Blue FC and the Seattle Reign in the NWSL and Brighton & Hove Albion in the FA Women's Super League.

Club career
After previously playing for Brisbane Roar and Melbourne Victory in the W-League, Stott joined Melbourne City for their inaugural season in 2015. She has played three seasons with Melbourne City winning three straight Championships.

On 17 January 2017 Stott signed with the Seattle Reign in the National Women's Soccer League. She made 22 appearances for the Reign in 2017.

On 11 January 2018 she was traded along with teammate Katie Johnson to Sky Blue FC. Due to injury Stott only made 9 appearances for Sky Blue.

After the 2018 NWSL season concluded, Stott signed with Avaldsnes IL in the Toppserien.

On 20 November 2019, Stott signed with Melbourne City.

On 2 September 2020, Stott signed a one-year deal with Brighton & Hove Albion who play in the FA Women's Super League however she returned to Australia in February 2021 for medical treatment, cutting her stint short. After four months of treatment, Stott got back on the field, playing a few minutes for Bulleen Lions in the Australian National Premier Leagues.

In August 2021, Stott returned to the W-League, re-joining Melbourne City.

International career
Having represented Australia at the U-17 and U-20 age group level, Stott chose to represent the country of her birth at senior level, making her senior début for New Zealand as a substitute in a 3–1 win over China on 17 June 2012, her 19th birthday.

In July 2012, Stott was named to the New Zealand squad for the London Olympics but did not play in any of the tournament games. Stott did play in all of New Zealand's games of the 2013 Valais Cup competition including a historic 1–0 win over Brazil and the 4–0 victory over People's Republic of China in the final.

She featured in all New Zealand's three matches at the 2015 FIFA Women's World Cup in Canada.

Stott was named to New Zealand's team for the 2016 Summer Olympics, she played every minute of their three games.

Personal life 
On 4 March 2021, Stott revealed on Twitter that she was diagnosed with Stage 3 Hodgkin's lymphoma while she was in quarantine after returning to New Zealand. The illness cut her time at Brighton & Hove Albion short, and she ended up losing all her hair. She is documenting her journey on a second Instagram account, and hopes to recover in time for when her country of New Zealand cohosts the 2023 FIFA Women's World Cup.
On 23 July, Stott announced on her personal website that her cancer was now in remission.

Career statistics

International goals
Updated 28 June 2020

Honours

Club
Brisbane Roar
W-League Championship: 2010–11

SC Sand
2. Bundesliga (south): 2013–14

Melbourne City
W-League Championship: 2015–16, 2016–17, 2017–18, 2019–20
W-League Premiership: 2015–16, 2019–20

Country
Australia
AFF U-16 Women's Championship: 2009

New Zealand
OFC Women's Nations Cup: 2014, 2018

Individual
IFFHS OFC Woman Team of the Decade 2011–2020
W-League Team of the Season

References

External links

 
 Seattle Reign FC player profile
 Profile at NZF
 
 Rebekah Stott personal website

1993 births
Living people
New Zealand women's association footballers
Footballers at the 2012 Summer Olympics
Olympic association footballers of New Zealand
Expatriate women's footballers in Germany
Expatriate women's soccer players in Australia
Brisbane Roar FC (A-League Women) players
Melbourne Victory FC (A-League Women) players
Melbourne City FC (A-League Women) players
Brighton & Hove Albion W.F.C. players
A-League Women players
New Zealand expatriate sportspeople in Germany
New Zealand expatriate sportspeople in Australia
2015 FIFA Women's World Cup players
Sportspeople from Tauranga
Women's association football defenders
New Zealand women's international footballers
Footballers at the 2016 Summer Olympics
Australian women's soccer players
Australian people of New Zealand descent
OL Reign players
National Women's Soccer League players
NJ/NY Gotham FC players
2019 FIFA Women's World Cup players
Expatriate women's footballers in Norway
New Zealand expatriate sportspeople in Norway
Avaldsnes IL players
Toppserien players
New Zealand expatriate sportspeople in England
Expatriate women's footballers in England
SC Sand players
New Zealand expatriate women's association footballers